The Red Lake shootings were a spree killing that occurred on March 21, 2005, in two places on the Red Lake Indian Reservation in Red Lake, Minnesota, United States. That afternoon, 16-year-old Jeff Weise killed his grandfather (an Ojibwe tribal police sergeant) and his grandfather's girlfriend at their home. After taking his grandfather's police weapons and bulletproof vest, Weise drove his grandfather's police vehicle to Red Lake Senior High School, where he had been a student some months before.

Weise shot and killed seven people at the school and wounded five others. The dead included an unarmed security guard at the entrance of the school, a teacher, and five students. After the police arrived, Weise exchanged gunfire with them. After being wounded, he shot and killed himself in a classroom. At the time, it was the deadliest school shooting in the United States since the Columbine High School massacre.

Background 
At the time of the shooting, by some accounts, Jeff Weise was living with his paternal grandfather, Daryl Lussier Sr., a sergeant with the Red Lake Police Department, run by the Ojibwe (aka Chippewa) tribal government at the Red Lake Indian Reservation. The household included his grandfather's 32-year-old girlfriend, Michelle Leigh Sigana. Weise's paternal aunts said he had lived mostly with them for the past several years, and they helped him get treatment for behavioral issues and depression. In 1999, Weise's mother suffered severe brain damage in an alcohol-related car accident and had since lived and received care in a nursing home. Still a child, Weise was forced to move from Minneapolis to live with his father's family on the reservation. His father had died by suicide in 1997, so Weise was officially placed with his grandmother 

The reservation of the Red Lake Band of Ojibwe is in northwest Minnesota and is one of two nationally that are "closed"; only Ojibwe tribal members may live there and own land. Its residents suffer high rates of unemployment, violence, and suicide. Housing is poor, and many students do not finish high school. Work opportunities are limited on the reservation, which has a population of more than 5,000. A study in 2004 found that a high proportion of students in high school had thought of suicide.

Shootings 
The day of the shootings, Weise retrieved a Ruger MK II .22 caliber pistol from his bedroom and fatally shot his grandfather as he was sleeping; he shot him two times in the head and ten times in the chest. According to Weise's friends, the teenager may have had the gun for as long as a year. He took Lussier's two police-issue weapons, a .40 caliber Glock 23 pistol and a 12 gauge Remington 870 pump-action shotgun, a gun belt and a bulletproof vest. Weise then fatally shot Sigana, his grandfather's girlfriend, two times in the head as she carried laundry up the stairs.

Weise then drove his grandfather's squad car to Red Lake Senior High School, arriving at around 2:45 p.m. CST. As he entered the school through the main entrance, he encountered two unarmed security guards manning a metal detector. Weise shot and killed security guard Derrick Brun, while the other security guard escaped without injury. Weise proceeded into the main corridor of the school.

Weise began shooting into an English classroom, killing three students and one teacher, and wounding three students. One student said that Chase Lussier (no direct relation to Weise's father or grandfather) sheltered her, and was one of those shot and killed by Weise. Jeffrey May, a 16-year-old sophomore, tried to wrestle Weise inside the classroom and stabbed him in the stomach with a pencil. May's diversion allowed students to flee the classroom to safety, but Weise shot him two times in the neck and once in the jaw, leaving him seriously injured.

Witnesses said Weise smiled as he was shooting at people. One witness said that he asked a student if he believed in God. This is believed to have been a reference to a widely publicized exchange during the 1999 Columbine High School massacre between perpetrator Dylan Klebold and Columbine survivor Valeen Schnur.

At around 2:52 p.m., Weise returned to the main entrance, where he killed two students and wounded two others. The police had arrived quickly and engaged him in gunfire. FBI Special Agent Paul McCabe said the shootout lasted for about four minutes. None of the police officers were injured. After being hit three times in the lower back, right leg, and right arm by police gunfire, Weise retreated to the classroom where he had shot and killed the teacher and students. Remaining students in the class witnessed him lean against a wall, put the shotgun barrel to his chin, and fire, killing himself.

The shootings lasted nine minutes. Weise fired a total of 59 shots during the shooting spree; 14 at his grandfather's home and 45 at the school. He fired 37 rounds from his grandfather's Glock handgun, 14 from his Ruger handgun, and eight from the shotgun.

Fatalities and funerals

A total of ten people, including the perpetrator, died in these events.

 Daryl Allen Lussier Sr., age 58, Police Sergeant and Jeff Weise's paternal grandfather.
 Michelle Leigh Sigana, age 32, Lussier's girlfriend.
 Derrick Brian Brun, age 28, Security Guard.
 Neva Jane Wynkoop-Rogers, age 62, English teacher.
 Alicia Alberta White, age 14, student.
 Thurlene Marie Stillday, age 15, student.
 Chanelle Star Rosebear, age 15, student.
 Chase Albert Lussier, age 15, student.
 Dewayne Michael Lewis, age 15, student.
 Jeffrey James Weise, age 16, student/perpetrator.

The night after the shooting, many people of the community gathered at the high school gymnasium for a healing ceremony. They performed traditional Ojibwe ceremonies and prayed.

Within days, preparations started for funerals on the reservation. Tribal members drew from Ojibwe traditions as well as Catholic rites. They "collected bundles of sage, to be given as gifts and burned during funeral ceremonies." Families picked personal items to be placed in the caskets.

Related events 
 Buck Jourdain, Chairman of the Red Lake Band of Chippewa Indians, said that the shootings were "one of the darkest and most painful occurrences in the history of our tribe."	
 Louis Jourdain, the son of the Tribal Chairman Floyd "Buck" Jourdain Jr., was arrested in connection with the shootings on March 28, 2005 and charged with conspiracy to commit murder. He was charged based on several email messages which he exchanged with Weise related to plans for the Red Lake High School shooting. The government dropped the conspiracy charge; however, Jourdain pleaded guilty to transmitting threatening messages through the Internet. 	
 Derrick Brun, the killed security guard, was recognized for his bravery, with special recognition by President George W. Bush.
 Jeffrey May, a sophomore injured while trying to attack Weise, was highly praised. He was featured in Reader's Digest.

Aid to victims and families 

Minnesota has a state fund that aids victims and their families. In addition, the Red Lake Band of Chippewa established a memorial fund; it reached $200,000 in donations from across the country by April 2005. Initially, the tribe made 15 grants of $5,000 each to victims and their families, including one to Weise's relatives. A tribal spokesman noted his family was not eligible for state compensation and said that they carried "a double burden." The grant was to help pay for Weise's funeral and burial.

On July 21, 2006, the Red Lake school district reached a settlement with the families of the massacre victims. The school district agreed to pay $1,000,000 total to 21 of the victims' families, the maximum amount allowed by Minnesota law. Of the settlement, $900,000 was to be immediately granted to the families, and the remaining $100,000 to be set aside for future distribution.

Perpetrator 

Jeffrey Weise was labeled an outsider in the Red Lake community and had recently been placed in "homebound" schooling for breaking school rules. He was remembered as a quiet kid that normally wore a black trench coat and gel in his hair.

Weise had grown up with a difficult and disrupted family life; his parents were a young unmarried couple who separated before he was born. His mother, Joanne Weise, was 17 years old at the time of his birth. Joanne's family insisted that she give up her son to the father, Daryl Lussier Jr., who was a few years older than her. Weise did not live with his mother again until after he was two years old, when she reclaimed him and took him to live in Minneapolis. In later online postings, Weise wrote that his mother had become an alcoholic who was sometimes physically and emotionally abusive.  Weise moved around often because of his mother, and attended several different schools during his adolescence.

In 1997, when Weise was eight years old, his father Daryl Lussier Jr. died by suicide at age 32, shooting himself after a days-long standoff with Red Lake tribal police. Weisse's grandfather, Daryl Lussier Sr., was a sergeant with the tribal police and was involved in the standoff.

In 1999, when Weise was ten, his mother was in an alcohol-related car accident and suffered severe brain damage. She had to be committed to a nursing home for rehabilitation.  Weise was placed in the custody of his paternal grandmother, who lived on the Red Lake reservation. He had to leave Minneapolis, where he had lived most of his life, to live with her and other paternal relatives in Red Lake.

Motives 
Police investigators began searching for a motive behind the shootings. According to their findings and media reports, Weise was often bullied or teased in school by classmates. A tall youth weighing 250 pounds (115 kg), he was known to wear dark eyeliner, as well as a long black trench coat and other black clothing to school year round. He was referred to as a "goth kid" by many of his classmates. 

Weise expressed frustration about living in Red Lake, and felt his life was beyond his control. During these years, he got close to his grandfather, Daryl Lussier Sr., who gave him a bedroom of his own. Weise was said to have a good relationship with his grandfather.

Although Weise had been separated from his mother and stepfather for years by the time of their divorce in May 2004, he attempted suicide soon after, and again in June 2004. At that time, his aunts and the Red Lake Medical Center arranged for Weise to be taken to a hospital for psychiatric treatment, where he stayed for three days.

Weise was prescribed Prozac as an anti-depressant, to be continued as treatment together with counseling. His doctor had increased his dosage a week before the shooting, to 60 mg a day of Prozac. Weise's aunts, with whom he lived much of the time at Red Lake, said they had arranged for his medical care and were concerned about the increase in his dosage. His actions reopened the debate about Prozac use among children and adolescents. In October 2004, the Food and Drug Administration (FDA) had issued a warning about its use, but it is still the only anti-depressant that is FDA-approved for children.

Internet activities 
Weise was discovered to have been quite active on the Internet. According to The Smoking Gun, Weise created two violent Flash animations for the flash website Newgrounds, using the alias "Regret". One animation, entitled "Target Practice", features a character who murders three people with a rifle, blows up a police car with a grenade, and kills a Klansman. The 30-second animation ends with the shooter putting the gun in his mouth and pulling the trigger. Weise had created another Flash animation, entitled "Clown", in which a clown kills a man by eating his head.

A LiveJournal account, apparently created by Weise, contained three entries posted between December 2004 and January 2005. The weblog was customized to be rendered in black and white. In his posts, Weise expressed his desire for change and salvation in his life.

Weise was a fan of the music genre known as horrorcore, and was particular a fan of rappers such as Mars, Jimmy Donn and Prozak. He was known to frequent the Mars website. Jimmy Donn's song "Game Over" (which is a song about a school shooting) was said to be one of Weise's favorite songs, and Weise owned Jimmy Donn's album The Darker Side.

Legacy and memorials 
Siblings of the victims and survivors participated in the 2018 School Walk Outs, which were designed to show respect for shooting victims seen nationally but especially in Florida and Red Lake.

See also 

 List of massacres in Minnesota
 Gun violence in the United States
 Mass shootings in the United States
 List of rampage killers

References

External links 
 Red Lake Schools website
 Red Lake Net News
 Sota Iya Ye Yapi On-Line, Earth Sky Web
 Jeff Weise, "Target Practice" (animation), Newgrounds

News articles 

 "Ten killed in US school shooting", BBC News, March 22, 2005.
 Karnowski, Steve. "Shooting suspect apparently posted messages on neo-Nazi site," Duluth News Tribune, March 22, 2005
 "The Depressive and the Psychopath", Slate'''
 "Native Americans Criticize Bush's Silence", The Washington Post, 25 March 2005
 "Tribal leader's son charged with conspiracy", Star Tribune'', 29 March 2005

2005 murders in the United States
21st-century mass murder in the United States
Anishinaabe culture
Beltrami County, Minnesota
Deaths by firearm in Minnesota
Mass murder in 2005
Murder in Minnesota
Murdered American children
School massacres in the United States
Massacres in the United States
Spree shootings in the United States
2005 in Minnesota
2005 mass shootings in the United States
Mass shootings in the United States
Crimes in Minnesota
Attacks in the United States in 2005
School shootings committed by pupils
March 2005 events in the United States
Mass shootings in Minnesota
High school shootings in the United States
Murder–suicides in Minnesota